Diacme samealis is a moth in the family Crambidae. It was described by Snellen in 1875. It is found in Colombia.

References

Moths described in 1875
Spilomelinae